The March 72A, also designated as the March 722A, and also known as the March 725, was an open-wheel formula racing car, designed, developed, and built by British manufacturer and constructor, March Engineering, for Formula 5000 racing, in 1972. It competed in both the European and SCCA U.S. F5000 championships, being driven by Canadian John Cannon. It was itself based on a March 722 Formula Two chassis, and was powered by a powerful  Oldsmobile V8 engine.

References

March vehicles
Formula 5000 cars